Mühlberger or Muhlberger is a German language habitational surname for someone from a place called Mühlberg. Notable people with the name include:

 Eugen Mühlberger (1902–1944), German weightlifter
 Gregor Mühlberger (1992), German mathematician
 Richard Muhlberger (1938), American art critic, and museum curator

References 

German-language surnames
German toponymic surnames